Manpower, or human resources, is the workforce in an organisation.

Manpower may also refer to:

Arts and entertainment 
Manpower (1941 film), an American comedy drama
Manpower (1942 film), an American government propaganda short
Man Power, a lost 1927 American comedy silent film
 Manpower (album), by Miquel Brown, 1983
"The Manpower!!!", a 2005 song by Morning Musume

Businesses and organizations 
ManpowerGroup, formerly Manpower Inc., a multinational corporation
Manpower Directorate, an Israel Defense Forces body 
Manpower Directorate (Australia), an Australian government body in World War II

See also 

 Manning (disambiguation)
 Human power,  work or energy produced from the human body
 Manpower Services Commission, a former British non-departmental public body